Ann Lorraine Maniego Colis (born September 15, 1993), simply known as Ann Colis, is a Filipino actress, model and beauty pageant titleholder who was crowned Binibining Pilipinas Tourism 2015 who was then elevated to Binibining Pilipinas Globe 2015 after the Binibining Pilipinas acquired the franchise of The Miss Globe in August 2015.

Background
Colis, was Binibini #24 at the Binibining Pilipinas 2015 pageant. She was a 20-year-old lass from Mexico, Pampanga who studied in the University of Santo Tomas with a degree in Management Accounting. She stands at 5’9″ and has been working as runway model for quite some time now. She was trained under Aces & Queens. She is currently doing modeling in the United States.

Ann also entered the world of acting as she played a role of a lesbian in an iWantTV series, Fluid.

Pageantry

Binibining Pilipinas 2015
Colis won the Binibining Pilipinas Tourism 2015 title for the supposed Miss Tourism Queen International 2015 pageant. She was appointed Binibining Pilipinas Globe 2015 after Binibining Pilipinas acquired the franchise for The Miss Globe pageant in August 2015.

The Miss Globe 2015
Colis was upgraded from Binibining Pilipinas Tourism to Binibining Pilipinas Globe titleholder giving her the right to represent the Philippines at The Miss Globe 2015 pageant in Toronto, Canada on October 8, 2015.

The night of October 8, 2015 at the Rose Theatre Brampton in Toronto, Canada, Colis was officially and unanimously crowned as The Miss Globe 2015.

References

External links

Binibining Pilipinas winners
1995 births
Living people
People from Pampanga
University of Santo Tomas alumni